The Congregation of the Priests of the Sacred Heart, also called the Dehonians, is a Catholic clerical religious congregation of Pontifical Right for men in the Catholic Church founded in northern France in Saint-Quentin, Aisne, Picardy, by Léon Dehon in 1878.

The congregation is present in over 40 countries on five continents (Europe, Africa, North and South America and Asia). It is headquartered in Rome. Carlos Luis Suarez Codorniú is the current superior general. In the United States, it is based in Hales Corners, Wisconsin. There it also operates the Sacred Heart School of Theology, the largest seminary in the United States for men over the age of 30 who are preparing for the priesthood.

Among other facilities, the Institute has owned and operated St. Joseph's Indian School in Chamberlain, South Dakota, since 1927. This is an off-reservation boarding school for grades K-8 that serves largely Lakota students.

Superiors general 
 Léon Dehon (28 June 1878 – 12 August 1925)
 Joseph Philippe (20 January 1926 – 24 October 1935)
 Theodorus Govaart (24 October 1935 – 7 September 1953)
 Alphons Lellig (11 January 1954 – 13 December 1958)
 Joseph de Palma (15 July 1959 – 6 June 1967)
 Albert Bourgeois (6 June 1967 – 6 June 1979)
 Antonio Panteghini (6 June 1979 – 24 May 1991)
 Virginio Bressanelli (24 May 1991 – 27 May 2003)
 José Ornelas Carvalho (27 May 2003 – 25 May 2015)
 Heiner Wilmer (25 May 2015 – 6 April 2018)
 Carlos Enrique Caamaño Martín (6 April 2018 – 20 July 2018)
 Carlos Luis Suarez Codorniú (20 July 2018 – )

Notable members
 Stanisław Nagy
 Eusébio Scheid
 Juan María de la Cruz
 André Prévot

See also
 Congregation (Catholic)
 Catholic religious order
 Sacred Heart
 St. Joseph's Indian School

References

External links
Official website

1878 establishments in France
Catholic religious institutes established in the 19th century
Religious organizations established in 1878